En Uyir Thozhan is a 1990 Indian Tamil-language film directed by Bharathiraja. The film was released on 16 February 1990 with positive reviews but failed at box-office; however it garnered cult following.

Plot 

The film revolves around an activist of a political party and his demise.

Cast 
 Babu as Dharma
 Thennavan as Ramesh
 Rama as Chittu
 Vadivukkarasi as Dharma's sister
 Livingston as Dilli Babu
 Charle as Pangu

Production 
The film marked the acting debuts of newcomers Rama, Thennavan and Babu.

Soundtrack 
The music was composed by Ilaiyaraaja, with lyrics by Gangai Amaran. The song "Machi Mannaru" is set in Mayamalavagowla raga.

References

External links 
 

1990 films
1990s Tamil-language films
Films directed by Bharathiraja
Films scored by Ilaiyaraaja
Indian political films